The Innu are an ethnic group of Canada.

Innu may also refer to:
 Innu language, an Algonquian language
 Innu Magazine, a magazine of Kerala, India
 Innu (album), a 1991 album by Canadian band Kashtin

See also 
 
 Inu (disambiguation)